Danovis Banguero Lerma (born 27 October 1989) is a Colombian footballer who plays for Atlético Nacional.

References

Living people
1989 births
Association football defenders
Colombian footballers
Cúcuta Deportivo footballers
Deportes Tolima footballers
Unión Magdalena footballers
Atlético Huila footballers
Atlético Nacional footballers
Categoría Primera A players
Categoría Primera B players
People from Villavicencio